Heinrich August Winkler (born 19 December 1938 in Königsberg) is a German historian.

With his mother he joined the westward flight in 1944, after which he grew up in southern Germany, attending a Gymnasium in Ulm.  He then studied history, political science, philosophy and public law at Münster, Heidelberg and Tübingen. In 1970 he became professor at the Free University of Berlin. From 1972 to 1991 he was professor at the University of Freiburg. Since 1991 he has held a chair of modern history at the Humboldt University Berlin. He has been a member of the Social Democratic Party of Germany (SPD) since 1962, and has ties to numerous prominent politicians within that party, including former Chancellor Gerhard Schröder. He is the author of a book detailing a comprehensive political history of the Weimar Republic, among others.

During the Historikerstreit, Winkler was a leading critic of Ernst Nolte.

Selected bibliography
 "From Social Protectionism to National Socialism: The German Small-Business Movement in Comparative Perspective," The Journal of Modern History Vol. 48, No. 1, March 1976 
 In Search of Germany (with Michael Mertes and Steven Muller). Transaction Publishers, New Brunswick and London 1996, 
 Germany: The Long Road West. Vol. 1: 1789–1933. Oxford University Press, Oxford 2006, 
 Germany: The Long Road West. Vol. 2: 1933–1990. Oxford University Press, Oxford 2007, 
 “Weimar 1918-1933: Die Geschichte der ersten Deutschen Demokratie.” C.H. Beck oHG, München 1993,

Notes

Further reading
 Berger, Stefan. "Rising Like a Phoenix… The Renaissance of National History Writing in Germany and Britain Since the 1980s." In:  online

External links
  Prof. Dr. Heinrich August Winkler Institute für Geschichtswissenschaften. Western history staff curricula vitae. Retrieved July 27, 2011 

1938 births
Living people
20th-century German historians
Historians of Europe
Writers from Königsberg
People from East Prussia
University of Münster alumni
Heidelberg University alumni
University of Tübingen alumni
Free University of Berlin alumni
University of Freiburg alumni
Humboldt University of Berlin alumni
Commanders Crosses of the Order of Merit of the Federal Republic of Germany
German male non-fiction writers
21st-century German historians